Strausberg Nord is a railway station in the city of Strausberg in Brandenburg. Located on the Strausberg–Strausberg Nord line, it is the eastern terminus of S-Bahn line .

Notable places nearby
Strausberg Airfield
Von-Hardenberg-Kaserne

See also
Strausberg Railway
Straussee Ferry
Strausberg station
Strausberg Hegermühle station
Strausberg Stadt station

References

External links

Nord
Nord
Berlin S-Bahn stations
Railway stations in Brandenburg
Buildings and structures in Märkisch-Oderland
Railway stations in Germany opened in 1955